The three teams in this group played against each other on a home-and-away basis. The group winner qualified for the seventh FIFA World Cup held in Chile.

Standings

Matches

References

External links
FIFA official page
RSSSF – 1962 World Cup Qualification
Allworldcup

4
1960–61 in German football
1961–62 in German football
1961–62 in East German football
1960–61 in Dutch football
1961–62 in Dutch football
1960–61 in Hungarian football
1961–62 in Hungarian football